The Shanmugha Arts, Science, Technology & Research Academy, also known as SASTRA, is a private and deemed university in the town of Thirumalaisamudram, Thanjavur district, Tamil Nadu, India. SASTRA is ranked by global ranking agencies such as Times Higher Education and QS. It offers undergraduate, post graduate and doctoral  courses in Engineering, Science, Education, Management, Law and the Arts.

History

SASTRA Deemed University started in 1984 in the form of Shanmugha College of Engineering, affiliated to the Bharathidasan University, Trichy. In 2001 it was renamed as Shanmugha Arts, Science, Technology & Research Academy.  It was the first institution to get the 'Deemed University status' in Tamil Nadu. Srinivasa Ramanujam Center at Kumbakonam is attached to it.

In 2011, software company Tata Consultancy Services set a world record of recruiting 1,755 students from SASTRA, the largest recruitment by any company in the world from a single campus.

Campus 
SASTRA will provide totally 119 courses across the 10 Streams.

Ranking

SASTRA has been re-accredited in the IV cycle with a 'A++' grade by National Assessment and Accreditation Council (NAAC), an autonomous body established by the University Grants Commission.

The QS World University Rankings ranked SASTRA 451-500 in Asia in 2020.

SASTRA was ranked 38th among engineering colleges in India by the National Institutional Ranking Framework (NIRF) in 2021, 22nd among universities, 17th among law colleges and 42nd overall.

Festivals
The first edition of Kuruksastra was held on 2–3 March 2007. The second edition of Kuruksastra was on 6–9 March 2008.

It started the tradition of hosting musical celebrities for a "Pro Nite" show with singers such as Shankar Mahadevan, Karthik, Mahathi, Pop Shalini, Stephen Devassy and Suchitra. It had over 1200 participants, making it one of the largest such festivals in the country.

Land encroachment case 
In 1985, the Thanjavur Revenue Department accused the institution with encroachment and issued an eviction notice. The institute objected and the parties engaged in a long judicial battle. The institute was sent with an eviction notice by the Madras High Court in 2018. The institute challenged this again seeking assignment of the said lands in its name, but the High Court rejected the case and issued a Government Order preventing lands to the assigned to the institute. The Tamil Nadu government on February 25, 2022 issued a eviction notice after the court's order.

See also
 SASTRA Ramanujan Prize
 SASTRA-CNR Rao Award
 Kuruksastra

References

External links

Private engineering colleges in Tamil Nadu
Education in Thanjavur district
Deemed universities in Tamil Nadu
Educational institutions established in 1984
1984 establishments in Tamil Nadu